Strashimirite (IMA symbol: Ssh) is a rare monoclinic mineral containing arsenic, copper, hydrogen, and oxygen. It has the chemical formula Cu8(AsO4)4(OH)4·5(H2O).

This mineral was discovered in Zapachitsa (Zapacica) copper deposit, Svoge, Sofia Oblast, Bulgaria in 1960, by the Bulgarian mineralogist Jordanka Minceva-Stefanova. She named the mineral after Strashimir Dimitrov (1892-1960), Professor in Mineralogy and Petrography at Sofia University "St Kliment Ohridski", Bulgaria. The International Mineralogical Association approved it as a new mineral in 1968.

It occurs as a secondary mineral phase in the oxidation zone of copper arsenide deposits. It occurs associated with tyrolite, cornwallite, clinoclase, euchroite, olivenite, parnauite, goudeyite, arthurite, metazeunerite, chalcophyllite, cyanotrichite, scorodite, pharmacosiderite, brochantite,
azurite, malachite and chrysocolla.

Although it remains quite rare, strashimirite has subsequently been identified in a number of locations including: Novoveska Huta in the Czech Republic; on the west flank of Cherbadung (Pizzo Cervandone), Binntal,
Valais, Switzerland; in Kamsdorf and Saalfeld, Thuringia, Germany; the Clara mine, near Oberwolfach, Black Forest, Germany; in the Richelsdorf Mountains, Hesse, Germany; Cap Garonne mine, near le Pradet, Var, and Triembach-au-Val, Haut-Rhin, France; Wheals Gorland and Unity, Gwennap, Cornwall, England; the Tynagh mine, near Loughrea, Co.
Galway, Ireland; the Majuba Hill mine, Antelope district, Pershing Co. Nevada, US;  and the Centennial Eureka mine, Tintic district, Juab Co., Utah, US.

See also 
 List of minerals named after people

Notes

External links

 

Arsenate minerals
Minerals in space group 3
Minerals in space group 6
Minerals in space group 10
Monoclinic minerals